The Miss Macau 2008 pageant was held in the Cotai Arena on September 7, 2008. Ten delegates completed for the title. The winner was Florence Loi, who competed at Miss International 2008.

Results

Placements

Special awards
Miss Photogenic: #8 Florence Loi
Miss Friendship: #1 Vanessa Chan
The Most Popular Miss Macau: #5 Ana Kuan Barroso
The Most Stylish and Glamorous Hair Award: #5 Ana Kuan Barroso

Judges
 Andy Hui
 Eric Tsang
 Angela Leong
 Gwennie Tam
 Mark A. Brown
 Yoyo Mung
 Kenneth Ma

Contestant list

Post-Pageant Notes
 Florence Loi unplaced in Miss International 2008 in Macau. 
 Florence Loi unplaced in Miss Chinese International Pageant 2009 in Foshan, China. 
 Florence Loi unplaced in Miss Tourism Queen International 2009 in Zhengzhou, China, but awarded Miss Tourism Asia 1st runner-up.
 Cherry Ng unplaced in Miss World 2010 in Sanya, China.
 Cherry Ng unplaced in Miss Earth 2011 in Quezon City, Philippines.
 Cherry Ng unplaced in Miss International 2012 in Okinawa, Japan.

References

2008 in Macau
Beauty pageants in Macau